Wetmoreana is a genus of lichen-forming fungi in the family Teloschistaceae. It has two crustose, saxicolous (rock-dwelling) species.

Taxonomy
The genus was circumscribed in 2013 by Ulf Arup, Ulrik Søchting, and Patrik Frödén, with Wetmoreana texana assigned as the type species. The genus name honours lichenologist Clifford Wetmore, "in appreciation of his major contributions to the knowledge of the North American Teloschistaceae". Three species were included in the original circumscription of the genus, but two of them have since been transferred to the genus Fulgogasparrea. Wetmoreana tenax was transferred to the genus in 2013 (from Xanthoria), but later (2020) moved to the genus Massjukiella.

Description
Both species of Wetmoreana are either squamulose or crustose with distinct . If apothecia are present, they are orange with a  form.

Species
 Wetmoreana brouardii  – Africa; North America; South America; Galápagos Islands
 Wetmoreana texana  – Texas, USA

Former species:
Wetmoreana appressa  = Fulgogasparrea appressa
Wetmoreana decipioides  = Fulgogasparrea decipioides
Wetmoreana tenax  =  Massjukiella tenax

References

Teloschistales
Lichen genera
Taxa described in 2013
Lecanoromycetes genera